Anne-Kristiina Haanpää  (born 25 May 1959) is a retired Finnish ice hockey forward and referee. Haanpää represented Finland at four IIHF World Women's Championships and helped Finland capture bronze medals each time, in 1990, 1992, 1994, and 1997 In 20 games over four world championships, she scored 8 goals and added 6 assists.

Haanpää was inducted into the Hockey Hall of Fame Finland as  #227 under the referee category.

References

External links
 
 

1959 births
Living people
Finnish ice hockey officials
Finnish women's ice hockey forwards
Ice hockey people from Tampere
Ice hockey players with retired numbers
Ilves Naiset players
Keravan Shakers players
Ässät Naiset players